The Journal of Huntingtons Disease is a quarterly peer-reviewed scientific journal in neuroscience that covers all aspects of Huntington's disease and related disorders. It was established in 2012 and is published by IOS Press. The editors-in-chief are Blair Leavitt (University of British Columbia) and Leslie Thompson (UC Irvine).

Abstracting and indexing
The journal is abstracted and indexed in Chemical Abstracts Service, Emerging Sources Citation Index, Index Medicus/MEDLINE/PubMed, and  Scopus.

References

External links

Huntington's disease
English-language journals
Neurology journals
Publications established in 2012
Quarterly journals
IOS Press academic journals